George Rieveschl (January 9, 1916 – September 27, 2007) was an American chemist and professor. He was the inventor of the popular antihistamine diphenhydramine (Benadryl), which he first made during a search for synthetic alternatives to scopolamine.

Early life and education
Born in Arlington Heights, Ohio, Rieveschl was the son of George and Alma Hoffling Rieveschl. He attended the Ohio Mechanics Institute before earning bachelors, masters, and PhD degrees at the University of Cincinnati (UC).

Career
After receiving his PhD in 1940, Rieveschl returned to the University of Cincinnati where he served as a professor of chemical engineering, and later a professor of materials science. At the university he led a research program working on antihistamines. In 1943, one of his students, Fred Huber, synthesized diphenhydramine.  Rieveschl worked with Parke-Davis to test the compound, and the company licensed the patent from him.  In 1947 Parke-Davis hired him as their Director of Research.  While he was there, he led the development of a similar drug, orphenadrine.

Rieveschl remained active in the Cincinnati-area science and arts community until his death at age 91 from pneumonia. He had contributed an estimated $10 million to his alma mater, according to a UC spokeswoman.

The main life sciences building on the campus of the University of Cincinnati is named for Rieveschl.

References

1916 births
2007 deaths
American chemical engineers
Scientists from Cincinnati
University of Cincinnati alumni
University of Cincinnati faculty
Deaths from pneumonia in Ohio
People from Lockland, Ohio
Engineers from Ohio
20th-century American engineers
20th-century American inventors